The Jennifer Hudson Show is an American syndicated daytime talk show. Hosted by singer and actress Jennifer Hudson, the series premiered on September 12, 2022.

Production
In November 2021, Deadline reported that Warner Bros. Television was developing a syndicated talk show hosted by Jennifer Hudson for the 2022–23 television season. The series was being pitched as a spiritual replacement for The Ellen DeGeneres Show after its conclusion in 2022, with its executive producers Andy Lassner and Mary Connelly moving over to the new show. The series was officially announced in March 2022, with Fox Television Stations as one of its first major carriers. In June 2022, it was announced that The Jennifer Hudson Show would premiere on September 12, 2022, and that it had been cleared in 95% of the U.S. In January 2023, the series was renewed for a second season.

The series carries over a number of elements and personnel from The Ellen DeGeneres Show, including its executive producers Mary Connelly, Andy Lassner, and Corey Palent. It is similarly filmed at Stage 1 at Warner Bros. Studios, Burbank, with parts of the existing Ellen set having been reused or modified.

Release
The Jennifer Hudson Show premiered on September 12, 2022 (which was also Hudson's 41st birthday); notable guests during its first week of shows included: Simon Cowell, Mickey Guyton, Hannah Waddingham, and Viola Davis. The premiere received a Nielsen rating of 0.7/4.

Episodes 
On the debut episode, Hudson welcomed and reunited its first guest of the show, former American Idol judge, Simon Cowell. On the second episode, Mickey Guyton makes an appearance and was the first artist to performed on the show, with her single: "Somethin' Bout You". NCT 127 is the first K-pop boyband to appear and perform on the show, with their single: 2 Baddies.

Season 1 (2022–23)

Reception

Critical reception 
In a review of her first week of shows, Daniel D'Addario of Variety felt that the aim of The Jennifer Hudson Show was "vague" in comparison to its competitors (such as The Kelly Clarkson Show) and "[steered] clear not merely of politics or of Hudson's innermost personal life, which would be completely expected, but from any tension or interest as well." It was also felt that Hudson's interviewing style lacked momentum, arguing that "guests often end up steering the conversation more than they usually might, while Hudson praises them for being sharp or funny without following up with questions."

Ratings

Overall

Accolades

References

External links 
 
 

2020s American television talk shows
2022 American television series debuts
English-language television shows
First-run syndicated television programs in the United States
Television series by Telepictures
Television series by Warner Bros. Television Studios
Television shows filmed in California